Edward Sivewright (10 November 1806 – 1 January 1873) was an English cricketer with amateur status. He was associated with Kent, Surrey and Cambridge University and made his first-class debut in 1828.

Sivewright was educated at Eton and Downing College, Cambridge. He was in the British Army (12th Lancers) from 1827 to 1841, rising to the rank of Captain.

References

1806 births
1873 deaths
English cricketers
English cricketers of 1826 to 1863
Cambridge University cricketers
Kent cricketers
Surrey cricketers
People educated at Eton College
Alumni of Downing College, Cambridge
12th Royal Lancers officers
Marylebone Cricket Club cricketers